The 1989 Big South Conference men's basketball tournament took place March 2–4, 1989, at the Winthrop Coliseum in Rock Hill, South Carolina. For the first time in their school history, the UNC Asheville Bulldogs won the tournament, led by head coach Don Doucette.

Format
All of the conference's seven members participated in the tournament, hosted at the Winthrop Coliseum, home of the Winthrop Eagles. Teams were seeded by conference winning percentage.

Bracket

* Asterisk indicates overtime game
Source

All-Tournament Team
Milton Moore, UNC Asheville
Harvey Shropshire, UNC Asheville
Brent Keck, UNC Asheville
Mark Mocnik, Campbell
Henry Wilson, Campbell
Greg Washington, Winthrop

This was the last year in which six players were selected to the All-Tournament Team. It was reduced to five the following year.

References

Tournament
Big South Conference men's basketball tournament
Big South Conference men's basketball tournament
Big South Conference men's basketball tournament